The 2010 FIM Scandinavian Speedway Grand Prix was the seventh race of the 2010 Speedway Grand Prix season. It took place on 14 August at the G&B Arena in Målilla, Sweden.

The Grand Prix was won by Pole Rune Holta who beat World Champion Jason Crump, new Grand Prix leader Tomasz Gollob and host rider Fredrik Lindgren. It was second GP winning by Holta, after 2008 Swedish Grand Prix in Gothenburg.

Riders 
The Speedway Grand Prix Commission nominated Thomas H. Jonasson as Wild Card, and Linus Sundström and Ludvig Lindgren both as Track Reserves. The draw was made on 13 August by the Jury President Jørgen L. Jensen.

Heat details

Heat after heat 
 Hancock, Bjerre, Holta, Zetterström
 Hampel, Andersen, Sayfutdinov, Pedersen (F3x)
 Gollob, Jonsson, Harris, Holder
 Crump, F.Lindgren, Jonasson, Woffinden
 Bjerre, Jonasson, Jonsson, Pedersen (R4)
 Gollob, Hancock, Hampel, Woffinden
 Holta, Harris, F.Lindgren, Andersen
 Zetterström, Crump, Sayfutdinov, Holder
 Hampel, Harris, Bjerre, Crump
 Hancock, Holder, F.Lindgren, Sundström
 Holta, Sayfutdinov, Jonsson, Woffinden
 Gollob, Jonasson, Andersen, Zetterström
 Holder, Woffinden, Andersen, Bjerre
 Hancock, Sayfutdinov, Harris, Jonasson (R4)
 Gollob, Holta, Crump, L.Lindgren
 F.Lindgren, Hampel, Jonsson, Zetterström
 Bjerre, F.Lindgren, Sundström, Sayfutdinov (F/-) Gollob (X)
 Crump, Jonsson, Andersenm, Hancock
 Jonasson, Holta, Holder, Hampel
 Harris, L.Lindgren, Woffinden, Zetterström
 Semi-Finals:
 Gollob, Crump, Hampel, Harris
 Holta, F.Lindgren, Hancock, Bjerre
 The Final:
 Holta (6 pts), Crump (4 pts), Gollob (2 pts), F.Lindgren (R4) (0 pts)

The intermediate classification

See also 
 motorcycle speedway

References 

Scandinavia
2010